Deer Creek is an unincorporated town in Carroll County, Indiana, in the United States. It is tracked by the United States Census as a census-designated place.

History
A post office was established at Deer Creek in 1832, and remained in operation until it was discontinued in 1910. The community was named from the eponymous creek.

Demographics

References

External links

Unincorporated communities in Carroll County, Indiana
Unincorporated communities in Indiana